Larissa Hope Wilson (born 5 May 1989) is an English actress best known for her role as Jal Fazer in the first two series of the UK television series Skins.

Career
In February 2008, Wilson guested at the Shockwaves NME Awards alongside fellow Skins actor Nicholas Hoult to present singer Kate Nash with the award for Best Solo Artist.

In July 2008, she appeared in an episode of Holby City playing the part of Rebecca Webster.

She reunited with Skins costar April Pearson in the 2009 film Tormented.

In 2011, she played Iris Bassey in the BBC television programme Shirley.

Also in 2011, she played as Anita in the BBC television programme The Sparticle Mystery but was only featured for the first series.

In 2012, she guest starred in the first episode of ITV mini-series The Town.

She is currently retired, but made a brief comeback in 2020 for a voice role.

In 2020, she starred in the BBC Sounds podcast series Murmurs.

Filmography

Television

Film

References

External links
 

1989 births
Living people
People from Kingswood, South Gloucestershire
Black British actresses
English people of Sierra Leonean descent
English television actresses
English film actresses
21st-century English actresses